Brahmanbaria Sadar is an upazila of Brahmanbaria District in the Division of Chittagong, Bangladesh.

History
The area Syed Mahmud resided in was named Kazipara (Kazi being a variant of Qadi) after him, and his mazar (mausoleum) remains there.

Brahmanbaria Thana was converted into an upazila in 1984.

However, there are many opinions or discussions among the locals about the name of Brahmanbaria district being "Brahmanbaria". The most popular and accepted discussion is that once upon a time there were many people of Sanatan religion living in Brahmanbaria. (There are still significant Sanatan religious people living in various places). Then there was lack of Brahmins to perform puja or religious rituals for orthodox people. The then king of the region sent several Brahmin families from faraway Calcutta to settle here. From there the name of this area is Brahmanbaria. Initially a few families lived in Kazipara and Kandhipara areas of the city. Originally the name of this place was Brahmanbari. Later on, the entire district was named Brahmanbaria.

Demographics
According to the 1991 Bangladesh census, Brahmanbaria Sadar had a population of 659,449. Males constituted 51.38% of the population, and females 48.62%. The population aged 18 or over was 312,696. Brahmanbaria Sadar had an average literacy rate of 30.1% (7+ years), against the national average of 32.4%.

Administration
Brahmanbaria Sadar Upazila is divided into Brahmanbaria Municipality and 11 union parishads: Basudeb, Bodhal, Dakshin Natai, Machihata, Majlishpur, Ramrail, Sadekpur, Shuhilpur, Sultanpur, Talsahar, and Uttar Natai. The union parishads are subdivided into 103 mauzas and 146 villages.

Brahmanbaria Municipality is subdivided into 12 wards and 34 mahallas.

See also
 Upazilas of Bangladesh
 Districts of Bangladesh
 Divisions of Bangladesh

References

Upazilas of Brahmanbaria District